Thor Sigfusson is an Icelandic entrepreneur, author and speaker. He is the founder and chairman of Iceland Ocean Cluster. He is also the co-founder of Codland, Hlemmur Food Hall and Grandi Food Hall.  He has written eight books on topics of international business, knowledge networks and salmon.

Early life and education 
Sigfusson was born in the Vestman Islands archipelago just off the south coast of Iceland. He completed his BA degree from University of North Carolina in 1991.

Career 
After completing his MS degree in Economics in 1993, he became a special advisor to the Minister of Finance of Iceland in January 1994. After working there for four years, he left the ministry to join the Nordic Investment Bank as deputy managing director. In January 2003, he left Nordic Investment bank and joined Iceland Chamber of Commerce as Managing Director.

In 2005, Sigfusson joined Sjova Insurance as Managing Director of the company. He left Sjova Insurance in 2009, after technically bankrupting that company by spending the claims fund on stocks, and joined University of Iceland for PhD in Business. In his studies he focused on how entrepreneurs used networks in their internationalisation. His studies indicated companies and entrepreneurs in the marine industry were not well connected with each other. He began working on a network to increase interaction between marine tech companies and launched the Iceland Ocean Cluster in 2011. The cluster focuses on developing innovative ideas in the fishing industry. In May 2012, Sigfusson founded the Ocean Cluster House.

Since establishing the Iceland Ocean Cluster, Sigfusson has spent his time speaking to audience in US and Europe about the opportunities in building networks in the marine industry. In 2015, Sigfusson co-founded a sister cluster to the IOC, the New England Ocean Cluster to drive new ideas in the marine industry.

Using the research and information generated from Iceland Ocean Cluster, Sigfusson founded Codland in September 2012. Codland emerged as the merger of a biotechnology company and fishing companies with plans to fully utilize byproducts from the North Atlantic Cod. The cluster also initiated the North Atlantic Marine Cluster Project, which works to increase relations between ocean and marine industries in the North Atlantic. In 2013, he founded the company Collagen with the aim to use fish skin to create marine collagen. In 2016 he co-founded Hlemmur Food Hall, Sjó-Food Hall and Reykjavik Foods.

Bibliography 
Brennan and Isis (2007)
International Business: New Challenges, New Forms, New Perspectives (2012)
Nordic Ways (Simonyi, Andras Ed.) (2016)

References 

Year of birth missing (living people)
Living people
21st-century Icelandic businesspeople